Gura Văii is a commune in Bacău County, Western Moldavia, Romania. It is composed of six villages: Capăta, Dumbrava, Gura Văii, Motocești, Păltinata and Temelia.

References

Communes in Bacău County
Localities in Western Moldavia